Thangallapally is the Mandal of Rajanna Sircilla district in Telangana, India.  It is located on the banks of Maner River, a tributary of the Godavari river. This Maner River separates it from its District Headquarters of Sircilla. Thangallaplly is situated 133 km north of Hyderabad, the capital city of Telangana.

References 

Villages in Rajanna Sircilla district